League of Bosnian Podrinje Canton is a fourth level league in the Bosnia and Herzegovina football league system. The league champion is promoted to the Second League of the Federation of Bosnia and Herzegovina - Center.

Member clubs
List of clubs competing in 2020–21 season: 

 NK BKB Berič-Bogušići
 FK Drina Goražde
 FK Jahorina - Prača
 FK Radnički Goražde

References

4
Bos